The following is a timeline of the history of the city of Montgomery, Alabama, USA.

19th century

 1819 - Montgomery incorporated.
 1821
 Montgomery Republican newspaper begins publication.
 Franklin Society founded.
 1824 - Presbyterian church and Montgomery Light Infantry established.
 1828 - Alabama State Library headquartered in Montgomery.
 1833 - Montgomery Advertiser newspaper in publication.
 1847 - Sons of Temperance formed.
 1850 - Lehman Brothers in business.
 1851 - Alabama State Capitol built.
 1861
 February: Montgomery becomes capital of the Confederate States of America; First White House of the Confederacy established; Jefferson Davis sworn in as president.
 May 21: Confederate capitol relocated from Montgomery to Richmond, Virginia.
 1864 - Atlanta-Montgomery railroad destroyed by Union forces.
 1867 - Swayne School built.
 1870 - Population: 10,588.
 1873 - Chamber of Commerce established.
 1877 - Second Colored Baptist Church established.
 1887 - Normal School for Colored Students opens.
 1889 - Hale Infirmary founded.
 1898 - Confederate monument dedicated.
 1899 - Montgomery Library Association organized.
 1900 - Population: 30,346.

20th century

 1901 - Alabama Department of Archives and History headquartered in Montgomery.
 1902 - St. Margaret's Hospital founded.
 1907 - Bell Building constructed.
 1910
 Wright Flying School begins operating.
 William Gunter becomes mayor.
 1913 - Rotary Club of Montgomery organized.
 1914 - Empire Theater built.
 1916 - Commission form of government adopted.
 1926
 Junior League of Montgomery organized.
 Scottish Rite Temple constructed.
 1927 - Jefferson Davis Hotel built.
 1929
 Municipal airport begins operating.
 State Teachers College active.
 1930
 WSFA radio begins broadcasting.
 Montgomery Museum of Fine Arts established.
 1938
 Coca-Cola bottling facility in operation.
 WCOV radio begins broadcasting.
 1940
 Population: 78,084.
 Veterans hospital begins operating.
 1941 - Mayor William Gunter dies.
 1942 - Montgomery Bible College founded.
 1947 - Alabama Historical Association headquartered in city.
 1948 - U.S. Maxwell Air Force Base established.
 1949 - City of Montgomery Library established.
 1950 - Population: 106,525.
 1953 - WCOV-TV (television) begins broadcasting.
 1954 - WSFA television begins broadcasting.
 1955 - December 1: Rosa Parks arrested; Montgomery bus boycott begins.
 1956 - December 20: Racial segregation lawsuit Browder v. Gayle verdict takes effect; bus boycott ends.
 1960 - Population: 134,393.
 1961 - May 20: Freedom Riders attacked.
 1964 - WKAB-TV begins broadcasting.
 1965
 March 7–25: Selma to Montgomery marches for voting rights.
 March 25: Martin Luther King Jr. delivers "How Long, Not Long" speech.
 1967
 February 7: Dale's Penthouse fire.
 Auburn University at Montgomery established.
 Alabama Historical Commission headquartered in city.
 1968 - Landmarks Foundation of Montgomery established.
 1971 - Southern Poverty Law Center founded.
 1972 - Montgomery Zoo opens.
 1977
 Wynnsong 10 cinema in business.
 Emory Folmar becomes mayor.
 1978 - Montgomery Genealogical Society established.
 1980 - Population: 177,857.
 1984 - Masjid Qasim Bilal El-Amin established.
 1985 - Alabama Shakespeare Festival active.
 1986 - Montgomery Area Food Bank established.
 1989 - Civil Rights Memorial dedicated.
 1990 - Population: 187,106.
 1992 - Montgomery County Historical Society organized.
 1995 - Equal Justice Initiative and F. Scott and Zelda Fitzgerald Museum established.
 1997 - City website online (approximate date).
 1999 - Bobby Bright becomes mayor.
 2000 - Population: 201,568.

21st century

 2005 - Hyundai Motor Manufacturing Alabama factory begins operating.
 2009
 Todd Strange becomes mayor.
 Sister city agreement established with Pietrasanta, Italy.
 2010 - Population: 205,764.
 2011 - Martha Roby becomes U.S. representative for Alabama's 2nd congressional district and Terri Sewell becomes U.S. representative for Alabama's 7th congressional district.
 2018 - April: National Memorial for Peace and Justice unveiled.
 2019 - Steven Reed becomes mayor.
 2020 - Population: 200,603.<ref>{{cite web |url = https://www.census.gov/quickfacts/montgomerycityalabama
 Montgomery records highest homicides total. https://www.wsfa.com/2021/02/26/montgomery-police-chief-addresses-homicide-rate/
 2021 - Montgomery records highest homicide rate in history. At 77 homicides.

See also
 History of Montgomery, Alabama
 List of mayors of Montgomery, Alabama
 National Register of Historic Places listings in Montgomery County, Alabama
 Timelines of other cities in Alabama: Birmingham, Huntsville, Mobile, Tuscaloosa

References

Bibliography

Published in the 19th century
 
 
 
 
  (includes "A Brief History of Montgomery" by M.P. Blue)
 
 M. P. Blue, Churches of the City of Montgomery, Montgomery, 1878. 
 
 
 

Published in the 20th century
 
 
 
 
 
 
 Clanton W. Williams. The Early History of Montgomery and Incidentally of the State of Alabama. Tuscaloosa: University of Alabama Press, 1976
 

Published in the 21st century

External links

 
 Items related to Montgomery, various dates (via Digital Public Library of America)
 

 
Montgomery
Years in Alabama